Kim Sun-kyu (born 7 October 1987) is a South Korean football player, who currently plays for K League Challenge side FC Anyang.

He led Dong-A University to win a University Tournament.

References

External links
 

1987 births
Gyeongnam FC players
Daejeon Hana Citizen FC players
FC Anyang players
K League 1 players
K League 2 players
Living people
South Korean footballers
People from Yangsan
Association football goalkeepers
Sportspeople from South Gyeongsang Province